The Women's Exhibition from the Past and Present held in Copenhagen in 1895 was an art and culture exhibition for women from the Nordic countries. Inspired by the 1893 World's Fair in Chicago, it was designed to demonstrate how far Nordic women had advanced in the areas of education, employment and art. The first of its kind in Europe, it was considered a great success.

Background

The Chicago World's Fair in 1893 had impressed Danish visitors with its Woman's Building containing presentations of art and literature. Sophie Oxholm (1848–1935), who had visited the exhibition, was obviously impressed by the exhibition, especially the show of Danish needlework. On her return to Denmark, she immediately brought a number of influential women together with a view to arranging a Nordic women's exhibition in Copenhagen the following year. Despite initial enthusiasm, as a result of budgetary and management problems, it was announced in February 1894 that the exhibition would not be held until 1895.

Oxholm, who experienced difficulty in managing the arrangements, gave up her position as head of the coordinating committee in early 1895. She was replaced by Bertha Buch of the Women's Society but it was Emma Gad (1852–1921) who proved to be the most effective member. Appointed deputy chair, Gad managed to complete all the arrangements on time. These included selecting the site of the exhibition which was ultimately shared between the Industrial Association building (Industriforeningen), which had been built in connection with the 1872 Nordic Exhibition, and the premises of Den Frie Udstilling. It was therefore possible for the exhibition to open on 22 June 1895 in the presence of Queen Louise.

Exhibition

In addition to exhibits from Denmark, the exhibition contained areas specifically dedicated to the Danish provinces and overseas territories (Faroe Islands, Greenland, Iceland and Danish West Indies) as well as to Norway and Sweden. There are records of the 2,415 exhibits covering painting, curiosities (including items associated with celebrated women), arts and crafts, costumes, jewellery (including gold- and silverware), literature (manuscripts, journals and books) and appliances. There were also separate listings of exhibits relating to housekeeping, philanthropy, hygiene, education, household crafts (spinning and weaving, leather, wood, embroidery, silk painting, and whitework), music and art.

For the Den Frie Udstilling building, there was a separate inventory of 301 artworks, paintings and sculptures, listed by artist.

Key organizers
The two women who were instrumental in organizing the exhibition were Sophie Oxholm and, above all, Emma Gad.

Outcome
The Women's Exhibition was a great success. Not only was it appreciated in Denmark and beyond, it made a substantial profit. Gad had hoped the money could be used for an independent "Women's Building" (Kvindernes Bygning) with a meeting room, reading room, restaurant and accommodation for women from the provinces. Work did not begin on the building until 1929. It was completed in 1937.

Exhibitors
Works by the following artists were included in the Women's Exhibition:

Sculptors 

 Elna Borch
 Henriette Diderichsen
 Agnes Lunn (also painter)
 Anne Marie Carl-Nielsen
 Johanne Pedersen-Dan
 Nielsine Petersen
 Adelgunde Vogt (posthumous)

Composers 
 Johanne Amalie Fenger
 Nanna Liebmann
 Elisabeth Meyer
 Tekla Griebel Wandall

Painters 

 Anna Ancher
 Marie Bang
 Ville Bang
 Brita Barnekow
 Louise Bonfils
 Alfrida Baadsgaard
 Clara Carl
 Anthonore Christensen
 Augusta Dohlmann
 Charlotte Frimodt
 Johanne Frimodt
 Henriette Hahn-Brinckmann
 Ane Marie Hansen
 Marie Henriques
 Sophie Holten
 Susette Holten
 Elise Konstantin-Hansen
 Johanne Cathrine Krebs
 Birgitte Levison
 Agnes Lunn (also sculptor)
 Marie Luplau
 Augusta Læssøe
 Emma Løffler
 Emma Meyer
 Jenny Meyer
 Emilie Mundt
 Bertha Nathanielsen
 Dagmar Olrik
 Anna Petersen
 Marie Preetzmann
 Louise Ravn-Hansen
 Holga Reinhard
 Marie Sandholt
 Charlotte Sannom
 Laura Sarauw
 Elisabeth Schiøtt
 Ida Schiøttz-Jensen
 Mimi Schwartzkopf
 Anna Smidth
 Olga Smith
 Edma Stage
 Emma Thomsen
 Emmy Thornam
 Ludovica Thornam
 Elisabeth Tornøe
 Nicoline Tuxen
 Elisabeth Wandel
 Bertha Wegmann

Posthumous 

 Elisabeth Jerichau Baumann
 Juliane Hammer (died shortly before the opening)
 Eleonore Christine Harboe
 Hanne Hellesen
 Marie Knudsen
 Julie Lütken
 Christine Løvmand
 Sophie Madsen
 Hermania Neergaard
 Bolette Puggaard
 Georgia Skovgaard (two sketchbooks from Italian travels 1854-55 and eight embroideries)
 Mariane Stub
 Eleonora Tscherning

References

External links
 Source

1895 in Copenhagen
Events in Copenhagen
Festivals established in 1895
19th century in Copenhagen
Art exhibitions in Denmark
Women and the arts
National exhibitions
History of women in Denmark
1895 in women's history
1895 in art